The 2021 Florida Gators football team represented the University of Florida in the 2021 NCAA Division I FBS football season. The Gators played their home games at Ben Hill Griffin Stadium in Gainesville, Florida, and competed in the Eastern Division of the Southeastern Conference (SEC). They were led by fourth-year head coach Dan Mullen, who was fired on November 21, and were then led by interim head coach Greg Knox.

Previous season

In the 2020 season, the Gators posted an 8–2 record in the all-SEC schedule, winning the Eastern Division.  They played No. 1 Alabama in the SEC Championship Game, narrowly losing 52–46. They received an invitation to play in the Cotton Bowl at AT&T Stadium in Arlington, TX, playing against Oklahoma, which they lost 55–20.

Schedule

Rankings

Game summaries

Florida Atlantic

South Florida

No. 1 Alabama

Tennessee

Kentucky

Vanderbilt

LSU

No. 1 Georgia

South Carolina

Samford

Missouri

Florida State

UCF (Gasparilla Bowl)

Personnel

Roster

  Redshirt
  Injury

Coaching staff

Players drafted into the NFL

References

Florida
Florida Gators football seasons
Florida Gators football